The 2012 Crédit Agricole Suisse Open Gstaad was a men's tennis tournament played on outdoor clay courts. It was the 45th edition of the Crédit Agricole Suisse Open Gstaad, and was part of the ATP World Tour 250 Series of the 2012 ATP World Tour. It took place at the Roy Emerson Arena in Gstaad, Switzerland, from 16 July through 22 July 2012.

Singles main draw entrants

Seeds

 1 Rankings are as of July 9, 2012

Other entrants
The following players received wildcards into the singles main draw:
  Sandro Ehrat
  Henri Laaksonen
  Bernard Tomic

The following players received entry as a special exempt into the singles main draw:
  Jan Hájek

The following players received entry from the qualifying draw:
  Dustin Brown
  Martin Fischer
  Jan Hernych
  Matteo Viola

Withdrawals
  David Ferrer (fatigue)

Retirements
  Édouard Roger-Vasselin

Doubles main draw entrants

Seeds

 Rankings are as of July 9, 2012

Other entrants
The following pairs received wildcards into the doubles main draw:
  Sandro Ehrat /  Paul-Henri Mathieu
  Henri Laaksonen /  Alexander Sadecky

Retirements
  Filippo Volandri (gastrointestinal illness)

Finals

Singles

 Thomaz Bellucci defeated  Janko Tipsarević, 6–7(6–8), 6–4, 6–2

Doubles

 Marcel Granollers /  Marc López defeated  Robert Farah /  Santiago Giraldo, 6–4, 7–6(11–9)

External links

Credit Agricole Suisse Open Gstaad
Swiss Open (tennis)
2012 Crédit Agricole Suisse Open Gstaad